The 2014 Florida Attorney General election took place on November 4, 2014, to elect the Attorney General of Florida. Incumbent Republican Attorney General Pam Bondi ran for re-election to a second term in office against Democrat George Sheldon  and Libertarian Bill Wohlsifer.

Republican primary

Candidates

Declared
 Pam Bondi, incumbent attorney general

Democratic primary

Candidates

Declared
 George Sheldon, former Assistant U.S. Secretary of Health and Human Services for Children and Families
 Perry E. Thurston, Jr., Minority Leader of the Florida House of Representatives

Declined
 Skip Campbell, former state senator and nominee for attorney general in 2006
 Maria Sachs, state senator

Endorsements

Results

Libertarian nomination

Candidates

Declared
 Bill Wohlsifer, Attorney at Law

General election

Campaign

Sheldon's constitutional eligibility to serve as attorney general was challenged in court. For the years 2011 to 2013, Sheldon established permanent non-Florida residency in order to receive an exemption from taking continuing legal education courses required to maintain his law license with the Florida Bar. Article IV, Section 5(b) of the Florida Constitution requires the candidates for attorney general maintain permanent residency in Florida for the seven years preceding election to office. The lawsuit named Sheldon and the Florida Secretary of State as defendants, and asked the court to remove Sheldon from the Democratic primary for attorney general. Leon County Chief Judge Charles A. Francis ruled that Sheldon was eligible for the ballot, stating that though he might have worked out of state, he maintained his residence in Tallahassee and continued to live there whenever he returned. The main lawyer involved in the case chose not to appeal the decision.

After Sheldon won his party's primary on August 26, Bondi challenged him to a general debate before the election. Sheldon stated that he would do so, but raised the possibility of multiple debates. Wohlsifer also challenged Bondi and Sheldon to a debate before the election. On September 9, Bondi's campaign sent out an email accepting an invitation to debate Sheldon in October, which he also accepted. While the Bondi campaign's email only mentioned Sheldon, Sheldon himself stated that he would welcome Wohlsifer's participation. Later on, it was confirmed that the debate would take place on October 6 and all three candidates would participate. It was pre-recorded and then broadcast only in Tampa and Orlando TV markets.

Candidates
 Pam Bondi (Republican)
 George Sheldon (Democratic)
 Bill Wohlsifer (Libertarian)

Endorsements

Polling

Results

See also
 Florida Attorney General

References

External links
Pam Bondi for Attorney General
George Sheldon for Attorney General
Bill Wohlsifer for Attorney General

Attorney General
Florida
Florida Attorney General elections